Asaad Babiker (born 31 August 2003) is a Finnish professional footballer who plays as a forward for Reipas.

Career statistics

Club

Notes

References

2003 births
Living people
Footballers from Cairo
Finnish footballers
Egyptian footballers
Sudanese footballers
Association football forwards
Kakkonen players
FC Lahti players
Reipas Lahti players